The discography of American singer Becky G consists of two studio albums, one extended play (EP), 74 singles (including 24 as a featured artist) and 10 promotional singles. She first began her career with videos posted onto popular video-sharing website YouTube prior to being signed to Kemosabe Records. She released her debut single, "Becky from the Block" (2013), after having previously collaborated with artists including will.i.am and Cody Simpson. Her second single, "Can't Get Enough" (2014), featured Pitbull and went on to top the Latin Rhythm Airplay chart in the United States. The song was featured on Gomez's debut extended play, Play It Again (2013). She achieved commercial success with her single "Shower" (2014), which became a top twenty hit on the Billboard Hot 100 chart. It went on to earn a multi platinum certification from the Recording Industry Association of America (RIAA).  

She released "Can't Stop Dancin'" (2014) as the second single from her debut album; it reached 88 on the Hot 100. Subsequent singles "Lovin' So Hard" (2015) and "Break a Sweat" (2015) fared similarly on the chart, failing to match the success of "Shower" (2014). She collaborated with Pitbull once more for the song "Superstar" (2016), which served as the theme song for the Copa América Centenario.

Gomez released her first Spanish single, "Sola" (2016), on June 24, 2016. The song had some success on Latin radio, reaching 24 on the Latin Pop Songs chart. She also featured on the Lil Jon single "Take It Off" (2016), alongside Yandel on guest vocals.

Gomez released her single "Mayores" on July 14, 2017, which saw an immense commercial success. It peaked at number 1 in several countries, including Spain, and has achieved more than 2 billion views on YouTube. She went on to work with long-time friend Leslie Grace on the single "Díganle", which was remixed a year later with vocals from Latin boyband CNCO. She worked with duo Mau y Ricky and Colombian singer Karol G on a remix of their song "Mi Mala", alongside Grace and Argentine singer Lali. Gomez released "Sin Pijama", in collaboration with Dominican singer Natti Natasha, on April 20, 2018, which saw mainstream success similar to that of "Mayores". Having featured singing in English songs beforehand, she released her own single "Zooted", featuring French Montana and Farruko. Shortly after, Gomez released "Cuando Te Besé" with Paulo Londra, which became the first song to top the Argentina Hot 100. She made her official return to the English market with "LBD", released on January 18, 2019.

Gomez released her debut studio album Mala Santa on October 17, 2019. Her highest-charting single on the Billboard Hot 100 is "Mamiii" in 2022, a collaboration with Karol G, also reaching number one on the Hot Latin Songs chart. She released her second studio album Esquemas on May 13, 2022.

Albums

Extended plays

Singles

As lead artist

As featured artist

Promotional singles

Other charted songs

Guest appearances

Notes

References

External links
 Official website
 Becky G at AllMusic
 

Pop music discographies
Discographies of American artists